Cahill Expressway is a 1962 painting by the Australian artist Jeffrey Smart. The painting depicts the Cahill Expressway, a motorway in inner Sydney. It is "considered by many to be one of his finest works" and "perhaps his best-known picture". The work has been described as "startling ... for its recognisability as an Sydney scene and doubly so for its timeless quality."

The Woolloomooloo extension of the Cahill Expressway was opened in March 1962, the same year as Smart made his painting. The painting shows a view looking into the newly constructed tunnel under the Domain with the State Library on the left and the Shakespeare Memorial just above.

Smart said "The start of the compositional form of Cahill Expressway was the driveway, the sweep, the lovely shapes, the image of something [the tunnel] going underground and the city continuing above the ground. The figure is not the reason for the composition at all – he ends up there almost as an afterthought. ... I gave the fat man only one arm here, and his other sleeve is tucked neatly into his pocket, as a purely compositional thing."

The fat, bald man features in many of Smart's paintings. Along with a range of other solitary figures depicted in Smart's work, he is "often interpreted as the embodiment of modern alienation." 

Resisting any interpretation or meaning behind the bald man's presence, Smart insisted that he was there to provide a sense of scale. As including people in his paintings could overly draw viewers' eyes, Smart attempted not to "make them too interesting; they are never beautiful or sexy" and he stated "a bald head makes a lovely volume and gives me a highlight.". Smart often mocked the idea of looking for meaning in his works: "That's what happens if you try to look too much into a picture ... You can't explain pictures."

The painting appeared on the cover of an edition of Peter Carey's collection of short stories, The Fat Man in History (1974). It also inspired a 1989 collection of short stories titled Cahill Expressway with the sub-title "twenty-nine Australian writers respond to Helen Daniel's invitation: stories based on Jeffrey Smart's painting Cahill Expressway".

The painting was acquired by the National Gallery of Victoria in 1963 and is part of its Australian art collection.

References

External links
Cahill Expressway – National Gallery of Victoria
The Cahill Expressway entering the Domain tunnel – Google Street View September 2014

1962 paintings
Australian paintings
Paintings in the collection of the National Gallery of Victoria